Tokas is the surname of the following people:

 Khazan Singh Tokas, swimmer
Marios Tokas (1954–2008), Cypriot composer of traditional music
Parmila Tokas, Indian politician
Rajat Tokas (born 1991), Indian actor
Vikas Tokas (born 1986), Indian cricketer
Rohit tokas boxer Birmimgham commonwealth bronze medalist

See also
 Tokaş, Taşköprü, a village in Turkey